Mompantero is a comune (municipality) in the Metropolitan City of Turin in the Italian region Piedmont, located about 50 km west of Turin in the Val di Susa, near the entrance of the Val Cenischia. Part of the town is on the slopes of the Rocciamelone.

References

External links
 Official website
 Pro Loco di Mompantero

Cities and towns in Piedmont